Landegode is an island in Bodø Municipality in Nordland county, Norway.

Most of the 48 islanders (in 2017) live in the southern village of Fenes. Landegode Church is also located in Fenes. Just off of the north end of the island, there are two lighthouses: Landegode Lighthouse and Bjørnøy Lighthouse.

See also
List of islands of Norway

References

Islands of Nordland
Bodø